The Samoan ambassador in Beijing is the official representative of the Government in Apia to the Government of the People's Republic of China.

List of representatives

China–Samoa relations

References 

 
China
Samoa